The Oakland Athletics' 2008 season marked their 40th year in Oakland, California. It was also the 108th season in franchise history. The team finished third in the American League West with a record of 75-86.

The Athletics were not expected to contend for the American League West title in 2008. Despite this, the team remained near first place well into July. The Athletics fortunes peaked on July 11, when a 9-2 rout of the Angels allowed them to pull within four games of first place. The team then lost 44 of its 68 remaining games. The slide saw the Athletics finish 24.5 games behind the Angels, who clinched the division for a second consecutive year.

The Athletics struggled at the plate for most of the season. Particularly troubling was the team's lack of power hitting; apart from Jack Cust, who hit 33 home runs, no Athletic hit more than 13. Oakland ultimately finished 11th (out of 14 American League teams) in this category. All told, the Athletics scored fewer runs (646) than any other American League team in 2008.

Off-season

Potential free agents
Outfielder Jeff DaVanon, catcher Mike Piazza and outfielder Shannon Stewart all filed for free agency after the 2007 season. DaVanon was signed to a minor league contract by the Athletics on August 10, 2007, after being let go by the Arizona Diamondbacks less than week later. His contract was purchased on August 17, following an injury to Mark Kotsay, who was plagued with injuries in 2007. He posted a .238 batting average and no home runs in 26 games for the Athletics. Piazza was signed in the previous offseason to a one-year contract which began Piazza's career as a designated hitter. In early May, Piazza was placed on the disabled list after suffering an injury while sliding into third base against the Boston Red Sox. Piazza was activated from the disabled list on July 20 but saw limited action after that as Jack Cust, who the Athletics brought in as a replacement, put on a big show once he joined the team. Piazza played in a total of 83 games in 2007 and batted .275 with 8 home runs. Stewart was also signed in the previous offseason to a one-year contract after missing most of the 2006 season. Stewart played in 146 games in 2007 and led the team in batting average (.290).

October
October 5: Outfielder Dee Brown, pitcher Ron Flores, infielder J. J. Furmaniak, pitcher Brad Halsey, pitcher Shane Komine, catcher Adam Melhuse and pitcher Jason Windsor were outrighted to the minor leagues. Brown, Flores, Furmaniak and Melhuse eventually declined their assignments and became free agents.
October 6: The Athletics announced that they would not renew the contracts of bullpen coach Brad Fischer, third base coach Rene Lachemann, and bench coach Bob Schaefer for the 2008 season.
October 11: Pitcher José García was claimed by the Athletics off waivers from the Florida Marlins. García had missed the entire 2007 season following Tommy John surgery.
October 13: Pitcher Jay Marshall and outfielder Kevin Thompson were claimed off waivers by the Boston Red Sox and the Pittsburgh Pirates, respectively. A Rule 5 draft selection from the Chicago White Sox, Marshall saw action in 51 games in 2007, mainly as a left-handed specialist. He put up a 1–2 record and a 6.43 ERA. Claimed off waivers from the New York Yankees on September 7, 2007, Thompson played in 9 games for the Athletics in the final month of the season, batting .071 with no home runs.

October 16: Ron Romanick was added to the Athletics coaching staff and will serve as the bullpen coach for the 2008 season.

October 23: Don Wakamatsu was added to the Athletics coaching staff and will serve as the bench coach for the 2008 season.

October 25: Outfielder Chris Snelling was claimed off waivers by the Tampa Bay Devil Rays.  Acquired on May 2, 2007, from the Washington Nationals for Ryan Langerhans, Snelling played in just 6 games before being placed on the disabled list on May 16 and never played in another game for the Athletics. That same day Connor Robertson was outrighted to the minor leagues. Robertson appeared in 3 games in 2007 and posted an 18.00 ERA. Tony DeFrancesco was also added to the Athletics coaching staff and will serve as the third base coach for 2008.

November
November 2: Pitcher Colby Lewis was claimed off waivers by the Kansas City Royals. Lewis mainly worked out of the bullpen for the Athletics in 2007, posting a 6.45 ERA and an 0–2 record in 26 games.

November 18: Infielder Marco Scutaro was traded to the Toronto Blue Jays for two minor league pitchers, Graham Godfrey and Kristian Bell. Scutaro, a valuable backup infielder, played in 104 games in 2007 for the Athletics, posting a .260 batting average and 7 home runs.

November 28: First baseman Wes Bankston was claimed off waivers by the Athletics from the Kansas City Royals. A minor league first baseman, Bankston played in the Tampa Bay Devil Rays minor league system in 2007. In 104 games in Triple-A with the Durham Bulls, he batted .238 with 15 home runs.

December
December 6: Pitcher Fernando Hernández was selected from the Chicago White Sox in the Rule 5 draft. Jay Marshall was reclaimed by the Athletics off waivers from the Boston Red Sox. To make room for Marshall, José García was designated for assignment. Marshall was later outrighted to the minor leagues on December 11 and José García was not offered a new contract and became a free agent on December 12.

December 13: The long-awaited Mitchell Report was released. It named many former Athletics players, including José Canseco, Jason Giambi, José Guillén, Jeremy Giambi, David Justice, Adam Piatt, F. P. Santangelo, Miguel Tejada and Randy Velarde. The report also named one current Athletics player, Jack Cust.

December 14: In a move that signaled the start of rebuilding for the Athletics, 2007 All-Star Game starter Dan Haren along with minor league pitcher Connor Robertson were traded to the Arizona Diamondbacks for pitcher Brett Andreson, first baseman Chris Carter, outfielder Aaron Cunningham, pitcher Dana Eveland, outfielder Carlos González and pitcher Greg Smith.  Haren, the Athletics ace in 2007, made 34 starts and posted career highs in wins (15), ERA (3.07), and strikeouts (192). Of the players acquired from the Diamondbacks, Eveland was the only one with major league experience, having made his debut for the Milwaukee Brewers in 2005. Eveland appeared in 5 games for the Diamondbacks in 2007, making one start, winning one game and posted a 14.40 ERA.

January
January 3: In another move as part of the Athletics rebuilding mode, outfielder/first baseman Nick Swisher was traded to the Chicago White Sox for pitcher Fautino de los Santos, pitcher Gio González and outfielder Ryan Sweeney. In 2007, Swisher posted a career high .262 batting average but had only 22 home runs, a big drop from 35 in 2006. Of the players acquired from the White Sox, Sweeney was the only one with major league experience, having made his debut for them in 2006. In 15 major league games for the White Sox in 2007, Sweeney batted .200 with a home run.
January 11: Outfielder Emil Brown was signed by the Athletics to a one-year contract. Brown, 33, started half the games for the Kansas City Royals in the outfield in 2007. He batted .257 with 6 home runs. According to Athletics assistant general manager David Forst, Brown's success against left-handed pitching was what appealed the Athletics into signing the right-handed veteran. To make room for Brown on the 40-man roster, fellow outfielder Danny Putnam was designated for assignment. Putnam made his debut in 2007 for the Athletics and batted .214 with a home run in 11 games.
January 14: In another move as part of the Athletics rebuilding mode, center fielder Mark Kotsay was traded to the Atlanta Braves for pitcher Joey Devine and minor league pitcher Jamie Richmond. Kotsay was limited to just 56 games in 2007 due to back problems that bothered him in the past. He hit just .214 with a home run in those 56 games. Devine spent most of the 2007 season in the minor leagues, splitting time in Double-A and Triple-A. In 10 major league games, all out of the bullpen, Devine went 1–0 with a 1.08 ERA.
January 25: Outfielder Jeff Fiorentino was claimed off waivers from the Cincinnati Reds. To make room for Fiorentino on the 40-man roster, pitcher Ruddy Lugo was designated for assignment. Fiorentino spent the entire 2007 season in the Baltimore Orioles organization, playing at the Double-A level for the Bowie Baysox. He hit .282 with 15 home runs and 65 RBIs for the Baysox. Lugo was claimed off waivers from the Tampa Bay Devil Rays earlier in the 2007 season and made a combined 38 relief appearances for the Devil Rays and the Athletics. He went 6–0 with a 5.40 ERA.

February
February 8: Pitcher Keith Foulke came out of retirement and signed a one-year contract with the Athletics. He had previously pitched for the Athletics in 2003, as their closer. To make room for Foulke on the 40-man roster, Bankston was designated for assignment and was later outrighted to Triple-A Sacramento on February 13.

March
March 25: First baseman and designated hitter Mike Sweeney had his contract purchased right before the Athletics first game. He had signed a minor league contract on February 11, 2008. He had previously spent his entire career with the Kansas City Royals and his last few years with them were plagued with injuries. Sweeney had done well in spring training to earn a spot on the Athletics 25-man roster.

Regular season

Season standings

Record vs. opponents

Season summary

March
The Athletics opened the regular season on March 25 in Japan and faced the Boston Red Sox there. Before the opener, the Athletics placed starting pitcher Chad Gaudin and third baseman Eric Chavez on the 15-day disabled list and placed relief pitcher Kiko Calero on the 60-day disabled list. The Athletics were allowed to carry 25 players plus three extra inactive players in case of injury. The three extra players were pitchers Justin Duchscherer and Dana Eveland along with outfielder Carlos González. The Athletics opened with ten pitchers, two catchers, seven infielders, five outfielders, and one designated hitter. The pitchers were Joe Blanton, Dallas Braden, Andrew Brown, Santiago Casilla, Lenny DiNardo, Alan Embree, Keith Foulke, Rich Harden, Fernando Hernández and Huston Street. Rob Bowen and Kurt Suzuki were the two catchers while Daric Barton, Bobby Crosby, Mark Ellis, Jack Hannahan, Dan Johnson, Donnie Murphy and Mike Sweeney were the seven infielders. The five outfielders were Emil Brown, Travis Buck, Chris Denorfia, Jeff Fiorentino and Ryan Sweeney, while Jack Cust was the designated hitter.

Joe Blanton got the nod to start the first game. The game went into extra innings and the Athletics lost 6–5 in 10. Emil Brown made a costly baserunning error in the 10th, which possibly cost the Athletics the game. Rich Harden started the second game of the two-game series and led the Athletics to a 5–1 win over the Red Sox after pitching six strong innings while giving up one run on three hits and also struck out nine.

Game log

|- align="center" bgcolor="#ffbbbb"
| 1 || March 25 || Red Sox* || 6 – 5 (10) || Okajima (1–0) || Street (0–1) || Papelbon (1) || 44,628 || 0–1
|- align="center" bgcolor="#bbffbb"
| 2 || March 26 || Red Sox* || 5–1 || Harden (1–0) || Lester (0–1) || || 44,735 || 1–1
|-
| colspan=9 | * At Tokyo Dome in Tokyo, Japan, see MLB Japan Opening Series 2008
|-

|- align="center" bgcolor="#ffbbbb"
| 3 || April 1 || Red Sox || 2–1 || Matsuzaka (1–0) || Blanton (0–1) || Papelbon (2) || 36,067 || 1–2
|- align="center" bgcolor="#ffbbbb"
| 4 || April 2 || Red Sox || 5–0 || Lester (1–1) || Embree (0–1) || || 21,625 || 1–3
|- align="center" bgcolor="#bbffbb"
| 5 || April 4 || Indians || 6–3 || Duchscherer (1–0) || Byrd (0–1) || || 13,916 || 2–3
|- align="center" bgcolor="#bbffbb"
| 6 || April 5 || Indians || 6–1 || Eveland (1–0) || Sabathia (0–1) || || 16,279 || 3–3 
|- align="center" bgcolor="#ffbbbb"
| 7 || April 6 || Indians || 2–1 || Lee (1–0) || Blanton (0–2) || Borowski (2) || 16,384 || 3–4 
|- align="center" bgcolor="#bbffbb"
| 8 || April 8 || @ Blue Jays || 9–8 || Embree (1–1) || Accardo (0–1) || Street (1) || 31,336 || 4–4
|- align="center" bgcolor="#bbffbb"
| 9 || April 9 || @ Blue Jays || 6–3 || Hernández (1–0) || Accardo (0–2) || Street (2) || 16,102 || 5–4
|- align="center" bgcolor="#bbffbb"
| 10 || April 10 || @ Blue Jays || 11 – 8 (12) || Devine (1–0) || League (0–1) || Foulke (1) || 16,521 || 6–4
|- align="center" bgcolor="#bbffbb"
| 11 || April 11 || @ Indians || 9–7 || Blanton (1–2) || Sabathia  (0–2) || Street (3) || 17,859 || 7–4
|- align="center" bgcolor="#bbffbb"
| 12 || April 12 || @ Indians || 7–3 || DiNardo (1–0) || Carmona (1–1) || || 19,170 || 8–4
|- align="center" bgcolor="#ffbbbb"
| 13 || April 13 || @ Indians || 7–1 || Lee (2–0) || Gaudin (0–1) || || 17,228 || 8–5
|- align="center" bgcolor="#bbffbb"
| 14 || April 14 || @ White Sox || 2–1 || Smith (1–0) || Buehrle (1–1) || Street (4) || 20,430 || 9–5
|- align="center" bgcolor="#ffbbbb"
| 15 || April 15 || @ White Sox || 4–1 || Danks (1–1) || Eveland (1–1) || Jenks (5)|| 18,254 || 9–6
|- align="center" bgcolor="#ffbbbb"
| 16 || April 16 || Mariners || 4–2 || Hernández (2–0) || Blanton (1–3) || || 21,126 || 9–7
|- align="center" bgcolor="#ffbbbb"
| 17 || April 17 || Mariners || 8–1 || Silva (3–0) || DiNardo (1–1) || || 10,164 || 9–8
|- align="center" bgcolor="#bbffbb"
| 18 || April 18 || Royals || 13–2 || Gaudin (1–1) || Bannister (3–1) || || 12,528 || 10–8
|- align="center" bgcolor="#bbffbb"
| 19 || April 19 || Royals || 6–5 || Devine (2–0) || Peralta (0–1) || Street (5) || 20,390 || 11–8
|- align="center" bgcolor="#bbffbb"
| 20 || April 20 || Royals || 7–1 || Eveland (2–1) || Hochevar (0–1) || || 18,645 || 12–8
|- align="center" bgcolor="#ffbbbb"
| 21 || April 22 || Twins || 5–4 || Rincón (2–0) || Blanton (1–4) || Nathan (7) || 10,267 || 12–9
|- align="center" bgcolor="#bbffbb"
| 22 || April 23 || Twins || 3–0 || Gaudin (2–1) || Bonser (1–4) || Street (6) || 15,242 || 13–9
|- align="center" bgcolor="#bbffbb"
| 23 || April 24 || Twins || 11–2 || Smith (2–0) || Liriano (0–3) || || 12,593 || 14–9
|- align="center" bgcolor="#bbffbb"
| 24 || April 25 || @ Mariners || 4–3 || Eveland (3–1) || Batista (2–3) || Street (7) || 40,845 || 15–9
|- align="center" bgcolor="#ffbbbb"
| 25 || April 26 || @ Mariners || 5–3 || Bédard (2–0) || Duchscherer (1–1) || || 37,563 || 15–10
|- align="center" bgcolor="#bbffbb"
| 26 || April 27 || @ Mariners || 4–2 || Blanton (2–4) || Hernández (2–1) || Street (8) || 32,612 || 16–10
|- align="center" bgcolor="#bbffbb"
| 27 || April 28 || @ Angels || 14–2 || Gaudin (3–1) || Garland (3–3) || || 37,725 || 17–10
|- align="center" bgcolor="#ffbbbb"
| 28 || April 29 || @ Angels || 2–0 || Saunders (5–0) || Smith (2–1) || Rodríguez (11) || 35,764 || 17–11
|- align="center" bgcolor="#ffbbbb"
| 29 || April 30 || @ Angels || 6–1 || Santana (5–0) || Eveland (3–2) || || 35,301 || 17–12
|-

|- align="center" bgcolor="#bbffbb"
| 30 || May 1 || @ Angels || 15–8 || Duchscherer (2–1) || Moseley (1–3) || || 37,396 || 18–12
|- align="center" bgcolor="#ffbbbb"
| 31 || May 2  || Rangers || 4–3 || Padilla (4–2) || Blanton (2–5) || Wilson (7) || 15,408 || 18–13
|- align="center" bgcolor="#ffbbbb"
| 32 || May 3 || Rangers || 6–3 || Murray (1–0) || Gaudin (3–2) || Benoit (1) || 20,524 || 18–14
|- align="center" bgcolor="#bbffbb"
| 33 || May 4 || Rangers || 3–1 || Casilla (1–0) || Feldman (0–1) || Street (9) || 31,673 || 19–14
|- align="center" bgcolor="#bbffbb"
| 34 || May 5 || Orioles || 2 – 1 (10) || Devine (3–0) || Johnson (0–1) || || 10,128 || 20–14
|- align="center" bgcolor="#bbffbb"
| 35 || May 6 || Orioles || 4–2 || Duchscherer (3–1) || Burres (3–3) || Casilla (1) || 11,492 || 21–14
|- align="center" bgcolor="#bbffbb" 
| 36 || May 7 || Orioles || 6 – 5 (10) || Braden (1–0) || Cormier (0–1) || || 15,235 || 22–14
|- align="center" bgcolor="#ffbbbb"
| 37 || May 9 || @ Rangers || 4–0 || Feldman (1–1) || Smith (2–2) || || 23,516 || 22–15
|- align="center" bgcolor="#ffbbbb"
| 38 || May 10 || @ Rangers || 6–4 || Rupe (1–1) || Eveland (3–3) || || 22,899 || 22–16
|- align="center" bgcolor="#bbffbb" 
| 39 || May 11 || @ Rangers || 12–6 || Casilla (2–0) || Germán (1–1) || || 23,959 || 23–16
|- align="center" bgcolor="#ffbbbb"
| 40 || May 13 || @ Indians || 4–0 || Byrd (2–3) || Duchscherer (3–2) || Kobayashi (1) || 16,974 || 23–17
|- align="center" bgcolor="#ffbbbb" 
| 41 || May 14 || @ Indians || 2–0 || Sabathia (3–5) || Blanton (2–6) || || 18,188 || 23–18
|- align="center" bgcolor="#ffbbbb" 
| 42 || May 15 || @ Indians || 4–2 || Laffey (2–2) || Smith (2–3) || Kobayashi (2) || 26,764 || 23–19
|- align="center" bgcolor="#ffbbbb" 
| 43 || May 16 || @ Braves || 3–2 || Acosta (2–1) || Embree (1–2) || || 31,004 || 23–20
|- align="center" bgcolor="#bbffbb" 
| 44 || May 17 || @ Braves || 5–4 || Harden (2–0) || Hudson (6–3) || || 38,324 || 24–20
|- align="center" bgcolor="#ffbbbb" 
| 45 || May 18 || @ Braves || 5–2 || Reyes (2–1) || Duchscherer (3–3) || || 31,025 || 24–21
|- align="center" bgcolor="#ffbbbb" 
| 46 || May 19 || Rays || 7 – 6 (13) || Hammel (3–2) || Gaudin (3–3) || Percival (12) || 11,077 || 24–22
|- align="center" bgcolor="#ffbbbb"
| 47 || May 20 || Rays || 3–2 || Kazmir (3–1) || Smith (2–4) || Percival (13) || 11,272 || 24–23
|- align="center" bgcolor="#bbffbb" 
| 48 || May 21 || Rays || 9–1 || Eveland (4–3) || Sonnanstine (6–2) || || 22,712 || 25–23
|- align="center" bgcolor="#bbffbb" 
| 49 || May 23 || Red Sox || 8–3 || Harden (3–0) || Wakefield (3–3) || || 29,057 || 26–23
|- align="center" bgcolor="#bbffbb"  
| 50 || May 24 || Red Sox || 3–0 || Duchscherer (4–3) || Beckett (5–4) || Street (10) || 33,468 || 27–23
|- align="center" bgcolor="#bbffbb"
| 51 || May 25 || Red Sox || 6–3 || Blanton (3–6) || Lester (3–3) || Street (11) || 35,067 || 28–23
|- align="center" bgcolor="#bbffbb"
| 52 || May 27 || Blue Jays || 3–1 || Smith (3–4) || Burnett (5–5) || Street (12) || 10,635 || 29–23
|- align="center" bgcolor="#ffbbbb"
| 53 || May 28 || Blue Jays || 2–1 || Halladay (6–5) || Foulke (0–1) || Ryan (12) || 17,460 || 29–24
|- align="center" bgcolor="#ffbbbb"
| 54 || May 29 || Blue Jays ||12–0 || Litsch (6–1) || Eveland (4–4) || || 21,862 || 29–25
|- align="center" bgcolor="#ffbbbb"
| 55 || May 30 || @ Rangers || 3–1 || Millwood (3–3) || Duchscherer (4–4) || Wilson (11) || 21,763 || 29–26
|- align="center" bgcolor="#ffbbbb"
| 56 || May 31 || @ Rangers || 8–4 || Ponson (4–1) || Blanton (3–7) || || 36,798 || 29–27
|-

|- align="center" bgcolor="#bbffbb"
| 57 || June 1 || @ Rangers || 13–8 || Gaudin (4–3) || Wright (3–2) || || 17,661 || 30–27
|- align="center" bgcolor="#bbffbb"
| 58 || June 2 || Tigers || 3–2 || Street (1–1) || Cruceta (0–3) || || 11,772 || 31–27
|- align="center" bgcolor="#bbffbb"
| 59 || June 3 || Tigers || 5 – 4 (11) || Gaudin (5–3) || Seay (0–1) || || 10,871 || 32–27
|- align="center" bgcolor="#bbffbb"
| 60 || June 4 || Tigers || 10–2 || Duchscherer (5–4) || Robertson (3–6) || || 19,258 || 33–27
|- align="center" bgcolor="#ffbbbb"
| 61 || June 6 || Angels || 3–1 || Lackey (2–1) || Blanton (3–8) || Rodríguez (25)|| 25,120 || 33–28
|- align="center" bgcolor="#ffbbbb"
| 62 || June 7 || Angels || 5–3 || Garland (6–3) || Smith (3–5) ||  Rodríguez (26) || 29,294 || 33–29
|- align="center" bgcolor="#bbffbb"
| 63 || June 8 || Angels || 7 – 3 (12) || Ziegler (1–0) || Bootcheck (0–1) || || 26,332 || 34–29
|- align="center" bgcolor="#ffbbbb"
| 64 || June 10 || Yankees || 3–1 || Wang (7–2) || Eveland (4–5) || Rivera (17) || 26,402 || 34–30
|- align="center" bgcolor="#bbffbb"
| 65 || June 11 || Yankees || 8–4 || Duchscherer (6–4) || Rasner (3–4) || || 27,292 || 35–30
|- align="center" bgcolor="#ffbbbb"
| 66 || June 12 || Yankees || 4–1 || Pettitte (6–5) || Blanton (3–9) || Rivera (18) || 28,658 || 35–31
|- align="center" bgcolor="#bbffbb"
| 67 || June 13 || @ Giants || 5–1 || Smith (4–5) || Zito (2–10) || || 42,445 || 36–31
|- align="center" bgcolor="#bbffbb"
| 68 || June 14 || @ Giants || 4–0 || Harden (4–0) || Cain (3–5) || || 40,873 || 37–31
|- align="center" bgcolor="#bbffbb"
| 69 || June 15 || @ Giants || 5–3 || Eveland (5–5) || Correia (1–4) || Street (13) || 41,547 || 38–31
|- align="center" bgcolor="#bbffbb"
| 70 || June 17 || @ D-backs || 15–1 || Duchscherer (7–4) || Webb (11–3) || || 28,710 || 39–31
|- align="center" bgcolor="#ffbbbb" 
| 71 || June 18 || @ D-backs || 11–1 || Haren (7–4) || Blanton (3–10) || || 28,507 || 39–32
|- align="center" bgcolor="#ffbbbb" 
| 72 || June 19 || @ D-backs || 2–1 || Peña (1–1)|| Foulke (0–2) || Lyon (15) || 31,997 || 39–33
|- align="center" bgcolor="#bbffbb"
| 73 || June 20 || Marlins || 7 – 6 (11) || Brown (1–0) || Waechter (0–2) || || 15,035 || 40–33
|- align="center" bgcolor="#ffbbbb" 
| 74 || June 21 || Marlins || 6–4 || Pinto (2–2) || Street (1–2) || Gregg (13) || 19,287 || 40–34
|- align="center" bgcolor="#bbffbb"
| 75 || June 22 || Marlins || 7–1 || Duchscherer (8–4) || Miller (5–6) || || 22,461 || 41–34
|- align="center" bgcolor="#bbffbb"
| 76 || June 24 || Phillies || 5–2 || Blanton (4–10) || Moyer (7–5) || Street (14) || 13,348 || 42–34
|- align="center" bgcolor="#ffbbbb"  
| 77 || June 25 || Phillies || 4–0 || Kendrick (7–3) || Smith (4–6) || || 22,231 || 42–35
|- align="center" bgcolor="#bbffbb" 
| 78 || June 26 || Phillies || 5–0 || Harden (5–0) || Eaton (2–6) || || 17,228 || 43–35
|- align="center" bgcolor="#bbffbb" 
| 79 || June 27 || Giants || 4–1 || Eveland (6–5) || Yabu (3–4) || Street (15) || 27,125 || 44–35
|- align="center" bgcolor="#ffbbbb" 
| 80 || June 28 || Giants || 1–0 || Lincecum (9–1) || Duchscherer (8–5) || Wilson (22) || 36,067 || 44–36
|- align="center" bgcolor="#ffbbbb" 
| 81 || June 29 || Giants || 11–1 || Sánchez (8–4) || Blanton (4–11) || || 33,841 || 44–37
|- align="center" bgcolor="#bbffbb"  
| 82 || June 30 || @ Angels || 6–1 || Smith (5–6) || Garland (7–5) || || 42,046 || 45–37
|-

|- align="center" bgcolor="#ffbbbb" 
| 83 || July 1 || @ Angels || 5–3 || Shields (4–2) || Embree (1–3) || Rodríguez (33) || 42,047 || 45–38
|- align="center" bgcolor="#ffbbbb" 
| 84 || July 2 || @ Angels || 7–4 || Saunders (12–4) || Foulke (0–3) ||  Rodríguez (34) || 41,091 || 45–39
|- align="center" bgcolor="#bbffbb"  
| 85 || July 3 || @ White Sox || 3–2 || Duchscherer (9–5) || Vázquez (7–7) || Street (16) || 26,730 || 46–39
|- align="center" bgcolor="#bbffbb" 
| 86 || July 4 || @ White Sox || 7–1 || Blanton (5–11) || Buehrle (6–7) || || 29,600 || 47–39
|- align="center" bgcolor="#ffbbbb" 
| 87 || July 5 || @ White Sox || 6–1 || Floyd (10–4) || Smith (5–7) || || 35,586 || 47–40
|- align="center" bgcolor="#ffbbbb" 
| 88 || July 6 || @ White Sox || 4–3 || Danks (6–4) || Harden (5–1) || Linebrink (1) || 31,955 || 47–41
|- align="center" bgcolor="#bbffbb"
| 89 || July 7 || Mariners|| 4–3 || Eveland (7–5) || Washburn (4–8)|| Street (17) || 11,129 || 48–41
|- align="center" bgcolor="#bbffbb"
| 90 || July 8 || Mariners || 2–0 || Duchscherer (10–5) || Silva (4–11) || || 12,543 || 49–41
|- align="center" bgcolor="#ffbbbb" 
| 91 || July 9 || Mariners || 6–4 || Corcoran (1–0) || Blanton (5–12) || Morrow (8) || 21,128 || 49–42
|- align="center" bgcolor="#bbffbb"
| 92 || July 10 || Mariners || 3 – 2 (11) || Street (2–2) || Jiménez (0–1) || || 15,187 || 50–42
|- align="center" bgcolor="bbffbb"
| 93 || July 11 || Angels || 9–2 || Gallagher (1–0) || Garland (8–6) || || 31,372 || 51–42
|- align="center" bgcolor="#ffbbbb" 
| 94 || July 12 || Angels || 4–1 || Santana (11–3) || Eveland (7–6) || Rodríguez (37) || 27,161 || 51–43
|- align="center" bgcolor="#ffbbbb" 
| 95 || July 13 || Angels || 4–3 || Arredondo (3–0) || Street (2–3) || Rodríguez (38) || 29,352 || 51–44
|- align="center" bgcolor="#ffbbbb" 
| 96 || July 18 || @ Yankees || 7–1 || Mussina (12–6)|| Smith (5–8) || || 54,145 || 51–45
|- align="center" bgcolor="#ffbbbb" 
| 97 || July 19 || @ Yankees || 4 – 3 (12) || Robertson (1–0) || DiNardo (1–2) || || 54,183 || 51–46
|- align="center" bgcolor="#ffbbbb" 
| 98 || July 20 || @ Yankees || 2–1 || Pettitte (11–7) || Duchscherer (10–6) || Rivera (24) || 54,366 || 51–47
|- align="center" bgcolor="#ffbbbb" 
| 99 || July 21 || @ Rays || 4–0 || Kazmir (8–5) || Eveland (7–7) || || 12,428 || 51–48
|- align="center" bgcolor="bbffbb"
| 100 || July 22 || @ Rays || 8–1 || Braden (2–0) || Sonnanstine (10–5) || || 16,800 || 52–48
|- align="center" bgcolor="#ffbbbb" 
| 101 || July 23 || @ Rays || 4–3 || Shields (9–6) || Smith (5–9) || Percival (20) || 23,437 || 52–49
|- align="center" bgcolor="#ffbbbb" 
| 102 || July 25 || Rangers || 14–6 || Padilla (12–5) || Blevins (0–1) || || 20,141 || 52–50
|- align="center" bgcolor="#ffbbbb" 
| 103 || July 26 || Rangers || 9–4 || Harrison (2–1) || Duchscherer (10–7) || || 20,653 || 52–51
|- align="center" bgcolor="bbffbb"
| 104 || July 27 || Rangers || 6–5 || Blevins (1–1) || Hurley (1–2) || Street (18) || 21,135 || 53–51
|- align="center" bgcolor="#ffbbbb"
| 105 || July 28 || Royals || 4–2 || Greinke (8–7) || Braden (2–1) || Soria (28) || 12,464 || 53–52
|- align="center" bgcolor="#ffbbbb"
| 106 || July 29 || Royals || 5–2 || Meche (9–9) || Smith (5–10) || Soria (29) || 12,182 || 53–53
|- align="center" bgcolor="#ffbbbb"
| 107 || July 30 || Royals || 4 – 3 (10) || R. Ramírez (2–1) || Street (2–4) || Soria (30) || 26,272 || 53–54
|-

|- align="center" bgcolor="#ffbbbb" 
| 108 || August 1 || @ Red Sox || 2 – 1 (12) || Timlin (4–3) || Embree (1–4) || || 37,832 || 53–55
|- align="center" bgcolor="#ffbbbb" 
| 109 || August 2 || @ Red Sox || 12–2 || Lester (10–3) || Eveland (7–8) || || 37,838 || 53–56
|- align="center" bgcolor="#ffbbbb" 
| 110 || August 3 || @ Red Sox || 5–2 || Matsuzaka (12–2) || Braden (2–2) || Papelbon (31) || 37,317 || 53–57
|- align="center" bgcolor="#ffbbbb"
| 111 || August 4 || @ Blue Jays || 6–1 || Halladay (13–8) || Gallagher (1–1) || || 24,761 || 53–58
|- align="center" bgcolor="#ffbbbb"
| 112 || August 5 || @ Blue Jays || 4–3 || Carlson (4–1) || Street (2–5) || || 23,580 || 53–59
|- align="center" bgcolor="#ffbbbb"
| 113 || August 6 || @ Blue Jays || 5–1 || Marcum (6–5) || Gonzalez (0–1) || || 29,256 || 53–60
|- align="center" bgcolor="#ffbbbb"
| 114 || August 7 || @ Blue Jays || 6–4 || Burnett (14–9) || Blevins (1–2) || Ryan (22) || 28,821 || 53–61
|- align="center" bgcolor="#bbffbb"
| 115 || August 8 || @ Tigers || 4–2 || Braden (3–2) ||  Rogers (8–9)  || Ziegler (1) || 41,457 || 54–61
|- align="center" bgcolor="#ffbbbb"
| 116 || August 9 || @ Tigers || 10–2 || Galarraga (10–4) || Meyer (0–1) || || 41,308 || 54–62
|- align="center" bgcolor="#ffbbbb"
| 117 || August 10 || @ Tigers || 6–1 || Robertson (7–8) || Smith (5–11) || Rodney (3) || 40,743 || 54–63
|- align="center" bgcolor="#bbffbb"
| 118 || August 12 || Rays || 2–1 || Gonzalez (1–1) || Kazmir (8–6) || Ziegler (2) || 14,284 || 55–63
|- align="center" bgcolor="#ffbbbb"
| 119 || August 13 || Rays || 3–2 || Sonnanstine (12–6) || Duchscherer (10–8) || Percival (27) || 21,438 || 55–64
|- align="center" bgcolor="#ffbbbb"
| 120 || August 14 || Rays || 7 – 6 (12) || Hammel (4–3) || Casilla (2–1) || Miller (1) || 16,689 || 55–65
|- align="center" bgcolor="#bbffbb"
| 121 || August 15 || White Sox || 6–4 || Street (3–5) || H. Ramírez (0–1) || || 19,405 || 56–65
|- align="center" bgcolor="#ffbbbb"
| 122 || August 16 || White Sox || 2–1 || Danks (10–5) || Smith (5–12) || Jenks (25) || 22,206 || 56–66
|- align="center" bgcolor="#ffbbbb"
| 123 || August 17 || White Sox || 13–1 || Vázquez (10–10) || Gonzalez (1–2) || || 28,843 || 56–67
|- align="center" bgcolor="#bbffbb"
| 124 || August 18 || @ Twins || 3–2 || Saarloos (1–0) || Blackburn (9–7) || Ziegler (3) || 25,024 || 57–67
|- align="center" bgcolor="#ffbbbb"
| 125 || August 19 || @ Twins || 13–2 || Slowey (10–8) || Gallagher (1–2) || || 35,256 || 57–68
|- align="center" bgcolor="#ffbbbb"
| 126 || August 20 || @ Twins || 3–1 || Liriano (4–3) || Braden (3–3) || Nathan (34) || 30,888 || 57–69
|- align="center" bgcolor="#bbffbb"
| 127 || August 21 || @ Mariners || 2–0 || Smith (6–12) || Rowland-Smith (2–2) || Ziegler (4) || 25,611 || 58–69
|- align="center" bgcolor="#ffbbbb"
| 128 || August 22 || @ Mariners || 7–5 || Corcoran (4–0) || Blevins (1–3) || Putz (8) || 26,603 || 58–70
|- align="center" bgcolor="#bbffbb"
| 129 || August 23 || @ Mariners || 5–1 || Eveland (8–8) || Washburn (5–14) || || 34,145 || 59–70
|- align="center" bgcolor="#ffbbbb"
| 130 || August 24 || @ Mariners || 8–4 || Hernández (8–8) || Meyer (0–2) || Putz (9) || 28,731 || 59–71
|- align="center" bgcolor="#bbffbb"
| 131 || August 25 || @ Angels || 2–1 || Braden (4–3) || Weaver (10–10) || Ziegler (5) || 39,584 || 60–71
|- align="center" bgcolor="#ffbbbb"
| 132 || August 26 || @ Angels || 5–1 || Lackey (11–2) || Smith (6–13) || || 37,431 || 60–72
|- align="center" bgcolor="#bbffbb"
| 133 || August 27 || @ Angels || 6–5 || Street (4–5) || Saunders (14–7) || Ziegler (6) || 38,587 || 61–72
|- align="center" bgcolor="#bbffbb"
| 134 || August 28 || Twins || 3–2 || Devine (4–0) || Breslow (0–2) || || 12,357 || 62–72
|- align="center" bgcolor="#ffbbbb"
| 135 || August 29 || Twins || 12–2 || Slowey (11–8) || Meyer (0–3) || Breslow (1) || 22,355 || 62–73
|- align="center" bgcolor="#bbffbb"
| 136 || August 30 || Twins || 3–2 || Street (5–5) || Nathan (0–1) || || 25,238 || 63–73
|- align="center" bgcolor="#ffbbbb"
| 137 || August 31 || Twins || 12–4 || Baker (8–4) || Smith (6–14) || || 18,427 || 63–74
|-

|- align="center" bgcolor="#ffbbbb"
| 138 || September 2 || @ Royals || 5–2 || Greinke (10–9) || Gonzalez (1–3) || Soria (34) || 11,143 || 63–75
|- align="center" bgcolor="#bbbbbb"
| — || September 3 || @ Royals || colspan=6|Postponed (rain) Rescheduled for September 4
|- align="center" bgcolor="#ffbbbb"
| 139 || September 4 || @ Royals || 5 – 4 (10) || Soria (2–3) || Devine (4–1)  || || — || 63–76
|- align="center" bgcolor="#ffbbbb"
| 140 || September 4 || @ Royals || 9–6 || Davies (6–6) || Meyer (0–4) || R. Ramírez (1) || 12,791 || 63–77
|- align="center" bgcolor="#bbffbb"
| 141 || September 5 || @ Orioles || 11–2 || Braden (5–3) || Waters (2–2) || || 14,984 || 64–77
|- align="center" bgcolor="#bbbbbb"
| — || September 6 || @ Orioles || colspan=6|Canceled (rain)
|- align="center" bgcolor="#bbffbb"
| 142 || September 6 || @ Orioles || 5–1 || Smith (7–14) || Cabrera (8–9) || || 21,553 || 65–77
|- align="center" bgcolor="#ffbbbb"
| 143 || September 8 || @ Tigers || 14–8 || Fossum (3–1) || Gonzalez (1–4) || || 37,981 || 65–78
|- align="center" bgcolor="#bbffbb"
| 144 || September 9 || @ Tigers || 3 -2 || Devine (5–1) || Rodney (0–5) || Ziegler (7) || 37,240 || 66–78
|- align="center" bgcolor="#bbffbb"
| 145 || September 10 || @ Tigers || 5–2 || Street (6–5) || Galarraga (12–6) || Ziegler (8) || 37,194 || 67–78
|- align="center" bgcolor="#ffbbbb"
| 146 || September 11 || Rangers || 6–1 || Nippert (3–4) || Braden (5–4) || || 10,566 || 67–79
|- align="center" bgcolor="#ffbbbb"
| 147 || September 12 || Rangers || 7–0 || Harrison (8–3) || Smith (7–15) || || 15,117 || 67–80
|- align="center" bgcolor="#bbffbb"
| 148 || September 13 || Rangers || 7–1 || Outman (1–0) || Feldman (5–7) || || 21,102 || 68–80
|- align="center" bgcolor="#bbffbb"
| 149 || September 14 || Rangers || 7–4 || Devine (6–1) || Madrigal (0–2) || Ziegler (9) || 18,551 || 69–80
|- align="center" bgcolor="#bbffbb"
| 150 || September 16 || Angels || 8–1 || Gallagher (5–6) || Lackey (11–4) || || 14,325 || 70–80
|- align="center" bgcolor="#bbffbb"
| 151 || September 17 || Angels || 3–2 || Ziegler (2–0) || Rodríguez (2–3) || || 20,102 || 71–80
|- align="center" bgcolor="#ffbbbb"
| 152 || September 18 || Angels || 6–4 || Saunders (16–7) || Outman (1–1) || Rodríguez (59) || 12,645 || 71–81
|- align="center" bgcolor="#bbffbb"
| 153 || September 19 || Mariners || 2–0 || Eveland (9–8) || Hernández  (9–11) || Ziegler (10) || 30,149 || 72–81
|- align="center" bgcolor="#bbffbb"
| 154 || September 20 || Mariners || 8–7 || Street (7–5) || Thomas (0–1) || Ziegler (11) || 18,756 || 73–81
|- align="center" bgcolor="#bbffbb"
| 155 || September 21 || Mariners || 5–3 || Ziegler (3–0) || Batista (4–14) || Devine (1) || 18,707 || 74–81
|- align="center" bgcolor="#bbffbb"
| 156 || September 22 || @ Rangers || 4 – 3 (11) || Embree (2–4) || Mendoza (3–8) || Casilla (2) || 14,925 || 75–81
|- align="center" bgcolor="#ffbbbb"
| 157 || September 23 || @ Rangers || 6–4 || Wright (8–7) || Embree (2–5) || Francisco (5) || 18,408 || 75–82
|- align="center" bgcolor="#ffbbbb"
| 158 || September 24 || @ Rangers || 14–4 || Harrison (9–3) || Eveland (9–9) || || 16,832 || 75–83
|- align="center" bgcolor="#ffbbbb"
| 159 || September 26 || @ Mariners || 10–8 || Morrow (3–4) || Gallagher (5–7) || Corcoran (3) || 24,662 || 75–84
|- align="center" bgcolor="#ffbbbb"
| 160 || September 27 || @ Mariners || 7–3 || Rowland-Smith (5–3) || Smith (7–16) || Green (1) || 24,440 || 75–85
|- align="center" bgcolor="#ffbbbb"
| 161 || September 28 || @ Mariners || 4–3 || Dickey (5–8) || Outman (1–2) || Putz (15) || 27,110 || 75–86
|-

Notable games
March 25, 2008 – As the 'home' team, in the Tokyo Dome, Japan, vs. the Boston Red Sox.
March 26, 2008 – Second game at the Tokyo Dome, Japan.

Player stats

Batting
Note: G = Games played; AB = At bats; R = Runs scored; H = Hits; Avg. = Batting average; HR = Home runs; RBI = Runs batted in; BB = Walks; SO = Strikeouts; SB = Stolen bases; OBP = On-base percentage; SLG = Slugging percentage

Starting pitchers 
Note: G = Games pitched; GS = Games started; IP = Innings pitched; W = Wins; L = Losses; ERA = Earned run average; BB = Walks; SO = Strikeouts

Relief pitchers 
Note: G = Games pitched; GS = Games started; IP = Innings pitched; W = Wins; L = Losses; SV = Saves; ERA = Earned run average; BB = Walks allowed; SO = Strikeouts

Roster

Farm system 

LEAGUE CHAMPIONS: Sacramento, Stockton

References

External links 

 Game logs
1st half: Oakland Athletics Game Log on ESPN.com
2nd half: Oakland Athletics Game Log on ESPN.com
Batting statistics: Oakland Athletics Batting Stats on ESPN.com
Pitching statistics: Oakland Athletics Pitching Stats on ESPN.com
2008 Oakland A's at Baseball Reference

Oakland Athletics seasons
Oakland Athletics season
Oak